Antonín Stavjaňa (born 10 February 1963) is a retired professional ice hockey player.

Stavjaňa played in the Czechoslovak Extraliga for HC Dukla Trenčín, TJ Gottwaldov and HC Zlín. He then moved to Finland for Jokipojat and in Sweden for HV71 before returning to the Extraliga with HC Vsetín. He was a member of the Czechoslovak 1987 Canada Cup and 1991 Canada Cup teams and competed for Czechoslovakia in the 1988 Winter Olympics and the 1994 Winter Olympics. Stavjaňa was drafted 247th overall by the Calgary Flames in the 1986 NHL Entry Draft but never signed a contract.

Stavjaňa later worked as a successful coach, coaching several teams, including HC Vsetín and HK Nitra.

Career statistics

Regular season and playoffs

International

References

External links
 
 
 
 

1963 births
Living people
Calgary Flames draft picks
Czech ice hockey defencemen
Czech ice hockey coaches
Czechoslovak ice hockey defencemen
HV71 players
Jokipojat players
PSG Berani Zlín players
VHK Vsetín players
Olympic ice hockey players of Czechoslovakia
Olympic ice hockey players of the Czech Republic
Ice hockey players at the 1988 Winter Olympics
Ice hockey players at the 1994 Winter Olympics
Sportspeople from Zlín
Czechoslovak expatriate sportspeople in Finland